Jermaine Crumpton (born April 8, 1994) is an American basketball player. He played college basketball for the Canisius College and was named the 2018 Metro Atlantic Athletic Conference Co-Player of the Year.

The Niagara Falls, New York native small forward played basketball at Niagara Falls High School and committed to Canisius in Buffalo as a junior. After sitting out the 2013–14 season as a redshirt, Crumpton was an immediate contributor, averaging 7.2 points in 17.6 minutes per game. As a junior, he averaged 15.9 points and 4.5 rebounds per game and was a third-team All-Metro Atlantic Athletic Conference (MAAC) selection.

In the off-season prior to his senior year, Crumpton underwent a weight training regimen and lost 30 pounds, resulting in an ability to be more active and improve endurance. The plan worked well, as at the close of the 2017–18 season, was named the MAAC co-Player of the Year with Niagara's Kahlil Dukes. The duo were also named honorable mention All-Americans by the Associated Press.

Crumpton signed his first professional deal with T71 Dudelange in Luxembourg’s Total League for the 2018–19 season.

References

External links
Canisius Golden Griffins bio
College stats @ sports-reference.com

1994 births
Living people
American expatriate basketball people in Luxembourg
American men's basketball players
Basketball players from New York (state)
Canisius Golden Griffins men's basketball players
Sportspeople from Niagara Falls, New York
Small forwards